Bodiam is a town in Amathole District Municipality in the Eastern Cape province of South Africa.

It is named after Bodiam Castle in England and was formerly known as Mandy's Farm.

See also
Bodiam Castle

References

Populated places in the Ngqushwa Local Municipality